Gnaphosa alacris is a ground spider species found in France, Italy, Croatia and Morocco. The spider hunts at night and hides during the day under rocks and leaves. Its body is oval, narrow and pointed at the rear.

The scientific name of the species was first published in 1878 by Eugène Simon.

See also 
 List of Gnaphosidae species

References

External links 

Gnaphosidae
Spiders of Europe
Spiders of Africa
Fauna of Morocco
Spiders described in 1878